Spaceway-3 is a communications satellite which was launched in August 2007. The third satellite in the Spaceway series, it includes a Ka-band communications payload. It is used by Hughes Network Systems to provide broadband Internet Protocol network service.

History 
In March 2007, shortly after the failure of a Sea Launch rocket launch in January 2007, Hughes Network Systems switched launch of Spaceway-3 from a Zenit-3SL rocket to an Ariane 5 launch vehicle.

Launch 
Spaceway-3 was launched 14 August 2007 on an Ariane 5 launch vehicle with BSAT-3a. It lifted off at 23:44 UTC from ELA-3 of the Centre Spatial Guyanais. Five hours and 46 minutes later, signals from the spacecraft were successfully received at a ground station in Hartebeesthoek, South Africa.

See also 

 Regenerative Satellite Mesh – A (RSM – A)

References 

Communications satellites in geostationary orbit
Satellites using the BSS-702 bus
High throughput satellites